The MoD Procurement Executive was the acquisition organisation of the Ministry of Defence.

The Procurement Executive (widely known as PE) was established on 2 August 1971 as a single procurement agency for all three services with Derek Rayner (later Lord Rayner) as the first Chief of Defence Procurement. It was superseded by the Defence Procurement Agency on 1 April 1999.

PE was responsible for the acquisition of equipment for the Royal Navy, British Army and Royal Air Force.

References

Ministry of Defence (United Kingdom)
United Kingdom defence procurement
Defunct executive agencies of the United Kingdom government
Organizations established in 1971
Organizations disestablished in 1999
1971 establishments in the United Kingdom